The Dugway sheep incident, also known as the Skull Valley sheep kill, was a March 1968 sheep kill that has been connected to United States Army chemical and biological warfare programs at Dugway Proving Ground in Utah. Six thousand sheep were killed on ranches near the base, and the popular explanation blamed Army testing of chemical weapons for the incident, though alternative explanations have been offered. A report, commissioned by Air Force Press Officer Jesse Stay and first made public in 1998, was called the "first documented admission" from the Army that a nerve agent killed the sheep at Skull Valley.

Background
Since its founding in 1941, much of the activity at Dugway Proving Ground has been a closely guarded secret. Activities at Dugway included aerial nerve agent testing. According to reports from New Scientist, Dugway was still producing small quantities of non-infectious anthrax of a type used in the making of vaccines as late as 1998, 30 years after the United States renounced biological weapons. There were at least 1,100 other chemical tests at Dugway during the time period of the Dugway sheep incident. In total, almost  of nerve agent were dispersed during open-air tests. There were also tests at Dugway with other weapons of mass destruction, including 332 open-air tests of biological weapons, 74 dirty bomb tests, and eight furnace heatings of nuclear material under open air conditions to simulate the dispersal of fallout in the case of meltdown of aeronautic nuclear reactors.

Incident
In the days preceding the Dugway sheep incident the United States Army at Dugway Proving Ground conducted at least three separate operations involving nerve agents. All three operations occurred on March 13, 1968. It is the third event that is usually connected to the Skull Valley sheep kill.

The incident log at Dugway Proving Ground indicated that the sheep incident began with a phone call on March 17, 1968, at 12:30 a.m. The director of the University of Utah's ecological and epidemiological contact with Dugway, a Dr. Bode, phoned Keith Smart, the chief of the ecology and epidemiology branch at Dugway to report that 3,000 sheep were dead in the Skull Valley area. The initial report of the incident came to Bode from the manager of a Skull Valley livestock company. The Dugway Safety Office's attempt to count the dead sheep compiled a total of 3,843.

Possible causes
Previously obtained documents said a nerve agent demonstration occurred the day before the sheep deaths.
On March 13, 1968, a F-4 Phantom fighter aircraft flew a test mission over the Dugway Proving Ground with chemical dispensers containing the nerve agent VX. One of the dispensers was not completely emptied during the test, and as the F-4 gained altitude after its bombing run, VX trickled out in a trail behind the aircraft, drifted into Skull Valley, north of the proving ground, and settled over a huge flock of sheep.

One explanation in the aftermath of the incident was that a chemical or biological agent had escaped from the Dugway Proving Ground. Circumstantial evidence seemed to support this assertion; the United States Army admitted to conducting open-air tests with VX in the days preceding the sheep kill. The Army intimated that a spray nozzle had malfunctioned during the test causing an aircraft to continue spraying VX as it climbed to higher altitudes. It was reported that a small amount of VX was found in the tissue of the dead sheep.

Other information contradicted the initial assumptions. One contradiction to nerve agent exposure as a cause came in the symptoms of some of the sheep following the incident. Several sheep, still alive, sat unmoving on the ground. The sheep refused to eat, but exhibited normal breathing patterns and showed signs of internal hemorrhaging. Regular breathing and internal hemorrhaging are inconsistent with nerve agent exposure, and "no other animals of any type, including cows, horses, dogs, rabbits, or birds, appeared to have suffered any ill effects, a circumstance that was hard to explain if VX had in fact caused the sheep deaths."

Aftermath
The incident affected the Army, and U.S. military policy within a year. The international infamy of the incident contributed to President Richard Nixon's decision to ban all open-air chemical weapon testing in 1969. The sheep incident was one of the events which helped contribute to a rise in public sentiment against the U.S. Army Chemical Corps during and after the Vietnam War. Ultimately, the Chemical Corps was almost disbanded as a result.

Following the incident, the Army and other state and federal agencies compiled reports, some of which were later characterized as "studies". A report which remained classified until 1978 and unreleased to the public until nearly 30 years after the incident was called the "first documented admission" by the Army that VX killed the sheep. In 1998, Jim Woolf, reporting for The Salt Lake Tribune, made the content of the report public for the first time. The report described the evidence that nerve agent was the cause of the sheep kill as "incontrovertible". The 1970 report, compiled by researchers at the U.S. Army's Edgewood Arsenal in Maryland, stated that VX was found in both snow and grass samples recovered from the area three weeks after the sheep incident.

The report concluded that the "quantity of VX originally present was sufficient to account for the death of the sheep." Even after the report surfaced, the Army maintained that it did not accept responsibility for the incident and did not admit negligence. As late as 1997, one year before the report went public, U.S. Department of Defense officials stated that "the reason it (the report) was never published is because it wasn't particularly revealing." Deseret News reported in June 1994 that Ray Peck, who owned the sheep that were killed, was outside working during the May 13, 1968, incident; members of his family developed nervous-system illnesses that were similar to those reported by people exposed to low levels of VX in lab experiments. Also, the probe showed that medical tests the Army had used to claim humans were not affected are now considered inconclusive, and the Pecks had shown other signs of low-level VX exposure.

In popular culture
This incident formed the basis for the 1972 motion picture Rage, directed by and starring George C. Scott.

The incident inspired Stephen King's novel The Stand.

Author Richard Kadrey used the incident as inspiration for the name of a fictional metal band, Skull Valley Sheep Kill, in his Sandman Slim novel series.

See also
 Deseret Chemical Depot
 Deseret Test Center
 Granite Peak Installation
 Operation CHASE
 Project 112
 Project SHAD
 Sverdlovsk anthrax leak
 Banjawarn Station
 Unethical human experimentation in the United States
 United States and weapons of mass destruction

References

Further reading
 Boffey, Philip M. "Nerve Gas: Dugway Accident Linked to Utah Sheep Kill", (log-in required to view article) Science. December 27, 1968, Vol. 162, No. 3861, pp. 1460–64. Retrieved November 26, 2007.
 "Sheep & the Army", Time, April 5, 1968, accessed October 10, 2008.
 "Toward the Doomsday Bug", Time, September 6, 1968, accessed October 12, 2008.
 Van Kampen, K.R., et al. "Effects of nerve gas poisoning in sheep in Skull Valley, Utah", Journal of the American Veterinary Medical Association, April 15, 1970; Vol. 156 Issue:8 pp. 1032–35, accessed October 10, 2008.
 Wright, Burton. "America's Struggle With Chemical-Biological Warfare", (book review), Army Chemical Review,  February 2001, accessed via FindArticles.com on October 12, 2008.

External links
 Biewin, John. "Sheep Kill", (radio broadcast), NPR, February 8, 1998, accessed October 10, 2008.
 Cianciosi, Scott. "The Sheep Incident", DamnInteresting.com, March 17, 2008, accessed October 12, 2008.

1968 in Utah
1968 in military history
1968 animal deaths
20th-century history of the United States Army
March 1968 events in the United States
Chemical warfare
Non-combat military accidents
Military in Utah
Sheep farming in the United States
Military scandals
Chemical weapons of the United States